The Wirral Endurance Ride is a ride on the National Championship calendar of Endurance GB. It is run by the Cheshire group of the organisation.

The ride normally is split into two, on a local beach and the Wirral Way route on Wirral Country Park.

As with each of the rides in the championship, the competitors are split into distance classes, in this case for the Wirral ride, there are normally six. Winners of these classes are determined by the average speed and grade they receive on the ride. The format is also used to determine the overall winner, which is usually one of these distance class winners.

Overall Ride Winners 
2008: Jackie Lloyd (Esta Leah)
2007:
2006: Ruth Wood (Abissinia)
2005: No event
2004: Tricia Hirst (Solomons Ikey)
2003: No event
2002: Melanie Gore (Sariff)

Endurance and trail riding
Equestrian sports in the United Kingdom